Kedaragaula (pronounced kēdāragaula) is a rāgam in Carnatic music (musical scale of South Indian classical music). It is a janya rāgam (derived scale) from the 28th melakarta scale Harikambhoji, and is sometimes spelled as Kedaragowla. It is a janya scale, as it does not have all the seven swaras (musical notes) in the ascending scale. It is a combination of the pentatonic scale Madhyamavati and the sampurna raga scale Harikambhoji. It is a morning rāgam.

Structure and Lakshana 

Kedaragaula is an asymmetric rāgam that does not contain gandharam and dhaivatam in the ascending scale. It is an audava-sampurna rāgam (or owdava rāgam, meaning pentatonic ascending scale). Its  structure (ascending and descending scale) is as follows:

 : 
 : 

The notes used in this scale are shadjam, chathusruthi rishabham, shuddha madhyamam, panchamam and kaisiki nishadham in ascending scale, with chatusruti  dhaivatam and antara gandharam included in descending scale. For the details of the notations and terms, see swaras in Carnatic music.

Popular Compositions
There are many compositions set to Kedaragaula rāgam. Here are some popular kritis composed in this ragam.

Tulasi Bilva mallikadi,O Jagannatha, Karunajaladhi and Venuganaloluni composed by Tyagaraja
Neelakantham and Nilotpalambikayai and "Abhayamba Nayaka" by Muthuswami Dikshitar
Saraguna palimpa by Poochi Srinivasa Iyengar
"Thandhani karattai" by Harini as a devotional composed by Manachanallur Giridharan
Emi gavalene manasa by Gnanananda Teertha (Ogirala Veera Raghava Sarma)
"Samikku Sari Evvare" by Papanasam Sivan
"Parakela Nannu" by Shyama Shastri
Gânakalâ Viduni by Kalyani Varadarajan

Other compositions  
Jaya Jaya Gajamukha Laavanyasaara by Kumaramangalam Vid. Srinivasaraghavan

Related Rāgams 
This section covers the theoretical and scientific aspect of this rāgam.

Scale similarities 
Madhyamavati has a symmetric pentatonic scale, with the notes same as the ascending scale of Kedaragaula. Its  structure is S R2 M1 P N2 S : S N2 P M1 R2 S
Yadhukula kambhoji is a rāgam which has the chatushruthi dhaivatam in ascending scale in place of the kaisiki nishadham. Its  structure is S R2 M1 P D2 S : S N2 D2 N2 P M1 G3 R2 S

Notes

References

Book Devi Gana Sudha in Telugu, Tamil by Gnanananda Teertha (Ogirala Veera Raghava Sarma)

Janya ragas